Hilarographa decoris is a species of moth of the family Tortricidae. It is found on the Kuril Islands, as well as in Sakhalin and Japan.

References

Moths described in 1976
Hilarographini
Moths of Japan